Megiddo church, near Tel Megiddo, Israel, is an archaeological site which preserves the foundations of one of the oldest church buildings ever discovered by archaeologists, dating to the 3rd century AD. The ‘Megiddo Church’, as the room became known, was dated to circa 230 AD on the basis of pottery, coins, and the inscriptional style. The site’s abandonment, circa 305 AD, is evident in the purposeful covering of the mosaic, and relates well to the crisis of 303 AD, when the Christian communities of Palestine experienced persecution instituted by the emperor Diocletian.

Location
The remains were found near Megiddo Prison, which is located a few hundred meters south of the tell and adjacent to Megiddo Junction in northern Israel. The area belonged to the ancient Roman town of Legio, known previously by its Hebrew name, Kefar ‘Otnay.

Discovery and description
In 2005, Israeli archaeologist Yotam Tepper of Tel-Aviv University discovered the remains of a church, believed to be from the third century, a time when Christians were still persecuted by the Roman Empire. Among the finds is an approx.  large mosaic with a Greek inscription stating that "The God-loving Akeptous has offered the table to God Jesus Christ as a memorial." The mosaic is very well preserved and features geometrical figures and images of fish, an early Christian symbol.

An inscription in the Megiddo church mentions a Roman officer, "Gaianus," who donated "his own money" to have a mosaic made.

Dating debate
The anthropologist Joe Zias, former curator for the Israel Antiquities Authority, said "My gut feeling is that we are looking at a Roman building that may have been converted to a church at a later date." On the other hand, persecution of Christians was sporadic in the Roman Empire during the early third century. The archaeological evidence may point to a later date, placing the church in the last quarter of the 3rd or first quarter of the 4th century.

See also
Legio, the Roman name of the town
Lajjun, the Arabic name of the later village
Oldest churches in the world

References

Ancient churches in the Holy Land
Archaeological sites in Israel
3rd-century churches
Buildings and structures in Northern District (Israel)